Mulawin vs. Ravena is a Filipino fantasy television series created and produced by GMA Network starring Dennis Trillo together with an ensemble cast. It is a sequel to the fantasy series Mulawin televised in 2004 and the 2005 film, Mulawin: The Movie. It premiered on May 22, 2017 on GMA Telebabad block and also aired worldwide through GMA Pinoy TV.

NUTAM (Nationwide Urban Television Audience Measurement) ratings are provided by AGB Nielsen Philippines while Kantar Media Philippines provide Nationwide ratings (Urban + Rural).

The series ended its 17-week run on September 15, 2017, with a total of 85 episodes. It was replaced by Super Ma'am.

Series overview

Episodes

May 2017

June 2017

July 2017

August 2017

September 2017

References

Mulawin
Lists of fantasy television series episodes
Lists of Philippine drama television series episodes